The Renault Frendzy was a concept leisure activity vehicle (M-segment) designed by Renault for the 2011 Frankfurt Motor Show at a similar size to the production Renault Kangoo. Its concept was designed by Renault's design chief Laurens Van den Acker with the exterior design accredited to Deyan Denkov.

Technical details

The Frendzy is based on the Renault Kangoo Z.E. and is powered by an electric motor developing  and is equipped with a lithium-ion battery pack.

References

External links

Renault Frendzy official website

Frendzy
Cars introduced in 2011
Front-wheel-drive vehicles
Electric concept cars
Vans
Electric vans
Mini MPVs